Lee Cho-hee (born October 4, 1989) is a South Korean actress. She was an ambassador for the 2013 Sangsang Madang Cinema Music Film Festival.

Career
Lee Cho-hee had a career breakthrough with her role as Song Da-Hee on the KBS weekend drama "Once Again". She won Best New Actress and Best Couple with Lee Sang-yi at the 2020 KBS Drama Awards.

Filmography

Film

Television series

Web Drama

Variety show

Music video

Discography

Awards and nominations

References

External links
 
 
 

1989 births
Living people
People from Daegu
South Korean child actresses
South Korean television actresses
South Korean film actresses
South Korean web series actresses
Seoul Institute of the Arts alumni